Stadio Silvio Piola is an association football stadium in Vercelli, Italy. It is the home ground of F.C. Pro Vercelli 1892. The stadium holds 5,500 and was named after Italy legend and former player Silvio Piola.

References

External links

Official Website
Stadio Silvio Piola at Stadium Journey

Silvio
Silvio Piola
Sports venues in Piedmont
F.C. Pro Vercelli 1892
Sports venues completed in 1932